The Feat Order is a service award conferred by the 
Government of Vietnam for "exceptionally outstanding feats, brave, wise, creative in excellently fulfilled assigned tasks in combat service".  It was established in 1947, and can be awarded to military personnel, individual civilians, or collectives.

See also 
 Vietnam awards and decorations

References

Orders, decorations, and medals of Vietnam
Military awards and decorations of Vietnam
Awards established in 1947
1947 establishments in Vietnam